The University of Adelaide's dental school is a component of the Faculty of Health and Medical Sciences at the University of Adelaide.

The Adelaide Dental School at the University of Adelaide engages in teaching and research.  Its programs include the Bachelor of Dental Surgery and the Bachelor of Oral Health together with a range of postgraduate degrees.  The school also offers to the dental profession a program of continuing education.

The teaching programs are highly regarded both nationally and internationally. It is the third-oldest university in Australia.

Research
The Adelaide Dental School is home to the Australian Research Centre for Population Oral Health.

Graduate programs
The Adelaide Dental School offers formal graduate programs leading to a Doctor of Clinical Dentistry degree (DClinDent) in the following areas:
Oral and Maxillofacial Pathology 
Oral and Maxillofacial Surgery (Offered conjointly with a medical degree from the Faculty of Medicine) 
Orthodontics 
Periodontics 
Prosthodontics
Endodontics
Special Needs Dentistry

The Faculty also offers graduate programs in Forensic Odontology and Restorative dentistry.

Accreditation
The University of Adelaide's dental school is accredited by the Australian Dental Council and the Royal Australasian College of Dental Surgeons.

References

External links
  The University of Adelaide School of Dentistry

Dentistry
Adelaide